Northumberland was an electoral riding in Ontario, Canada. It was created in 1926 from the merger of Northumberland East and Northumberland West. It was abolished in 2007 when it was merged into the new riding of Northumberland—Quinte West.

Members of Provincial Parliament

Election results

External links
 Elections Ontario  1999 results and 2003 results

References

Former provincial electoral districts of Ontario